Burton Rugby Club is an English rugby union team based in Burton upon Trent in Staffordshire. The club operates six senior teams, including an under-22s team, academy sides and a full range of junior teams. The first XV currently plays in Midlands Premier following their promotion as champions of Midlands 1 West at the end of the 2017–18 season.

History
Burton Rugby Club was formed on 5 October 1870 as Burton Football Club, retaining that name until the word 'rugby' was added in 2001. The club played at Peel Croft, from 1910 until it moved to a new ground at Tatenhill in 2020.

Honours
Midland Counties Cup winners (2): 1882–83, 1887–88
Staffordshire Senior Cup winners (7): 1992, 2000, 2005, 2012, 2015, 2017, 2018, 2019
Midlands 1 West champions (4): 1992–93, 2004–05, 2009–10, 2017–18
Midlands 3 West (North) champions: 2003–04
Midlands 1 (east v west) promotion play-off winner: 2013–14

Notes

References

External links
Official club website

English rugby union teams
Rugby clubs established in 1870
Rugby union in Staffordshire
Sport in Burton upon Trent